Mesoscia dumilla is a moth of the Megalopygidae family. It was described by Harrison Gray Dyar Jr. in 1913.

References

Moths described in 1913
Megalopygidae